The Soha Junction(소하 분기점, romanised: soha bungijeom) is a junction of the Seohaean Expressway, Suwon–Munsan Expressway, and the Gangnamsunhwan-ro in Soha-dong, Gwangmyeong, Gyeonggi Province, Republic of Korea.

Roads

History 
 July 3, 2016: The junction was opened.

References

Seohaean Expressway
Suwon–Munsan Expressway
Expressway junctions in South Korea
Gwangmyeong
Geumcheon District